The 1996 Kremlin Cup was a tennis tournament played on indoor carpet courts at the Olympic Stadium in Moscow in Russia that was part of the World Series of the 1996 ATP Tour and of Tier III of the 1996 WTA Tour. The men's tournament was held from 4 November through 10 November 1996 while the women's tournament was held from 27 October through 3 November 1996. Goran Ivanišević and Conchita Martínez won the singles titles.

Finals

Men's singles

 Goran Ivanišević defeated  Yevgeny Kafelnikov 3–6, 6–1, 6–3
 It was Ivanišević's 5th title of the year and the 17th of his career.

Women's singles

 Conchita Martínez defeated  Barbara Paulus 6–1, 4–6, 6–4
 It was Martínez's 2nd title of the year and the 28th of her career.

Men's doubles

 Rick Leach /  Andrei Olhovskiy defeated  Jiří Novák /  David Rikl 4–6, 6–1, 6–2
 It was Leach's 4th title of the year and the 35th of his career. It was Olhovskiy's 4th title of the year and the 16th of his career.

Women's doubles

 Natalia Medvedeva /  Larisa Neiland defeated  Silvia Farina /  Barbara Schett 7–6, 4–6, 6–1
 It was Medvedeva's 2nd title of the year and the 12th of her career. It was Neiland's 5th title of the year and the 58th of her career.

External links
 Official website 
 Official website 
 ATP Tournament Profile
 WTA Tournament Profile

Kremlin Cup
Kremlin Cup
Kremlin Cup
Kremlin Cup
Kremlin Cup
Kremlin Cup
Kremlin Cup